Outlawed is a 1921 American silent Western film written and directed by Alan James. The film stars Carlyn Wagner, Bill Patton, and Buck Connors.

Cast list

References

1921 films
1921 Western (genre) films
1920s English-language films
Films directed by Alan James
Silent American Western (genre) films
1920s American films